Block 216 is the working name of a high-rise building under construction in downtown Portland, Oregon, United States. The 35-story building replaced the Alder Street food cart pod and parking lot between 9th and 10th Avenues and Alder and Washington Streets.

The Alder food pod with more than a dozen vendors, Portland's largest, closed in June 2019. The groundbreaking ceremony was held on July 12, 2019.

Block 216 was designed by Portland-based architecture firm, GBD Architects and, when completed, will be the largest building by volume constructed in Portland since the U.S. Bancorp Tower.

The building will house a Ritz-Carlton hotel (the first in the Pacific Northwest) named Ritz-Carlton, Portland, as well as have office space and condominium units. Businesses slated to operate stalls in the food hall include Birrieria La Plaza, Kim Jong Grillin', and Magna Kusina.

See also

 List of tallest buildings in Portland, Oregon

References

External links
 

Buildings and structures in Portland, Oregon
Buildings and structures under construction in the United States
Southwest Portland, Oregon